The Carlos Palanca Memorial Awards for Literature winners for 2009 (rank, name of author, title of winning entry (italicized, in parentheses)). The awarding ceremonies were held on September 1, 2009, at the Peninsula Hotel Manila in Makati.

Filipino division
Sanaysay

1st – Reuel Molina Aguila (Ngunit Wala Akong Litrato Noong Nasa Kolehiyo Ako)

2nd – Jing Panganiban-Mendoza (Kumander)

3rd – Jahanie Sultan(Sung Hoo's Wife)  (Kamay)

Tula

1st – Reagan R. Maiquez (Ilang Sandali Makalipas ang Huling Araw ng Mundo)

2nd – Alwynn C. Javier (Yaong Pakpak na Binunot sa Akin)

3rd – Charles B. Tuvilla (Sambutil na Daigdig sa Ilalim ng Pilik)

Maikling Kuwento (Short story)

1st – No winner

2nd – Rogelio Braga ("MGA")

3rd – Jimmuel C. Naval (Ang Kamatayan ng Isang Linggo)

Dulang Pampelikula

1st – Seymour Barros Sanchez & Christian M. Lacuesta (Hiwaga)

2nd – Jerry B. Gracio (Muli)

3rd – Enrique Ramos (Moonlight Over Baler)

Dulang Ganap ang Haba

1st – Rodolfo C. Vera (Ismail at Isabel)

2nd – Reuel Molina Aguila (Sa Kanto ng Wakas at Katotohanan Ext.)

3rd – Sir Anril P. Tiatco (Miss Dulce Extranjera)

Dulang May Isang Yugto

1st – Layeta P. Bucoy (Doc Resurreccion: Gagamutin ang Bayan)

2nd – Liza C. Magtoto (Paigan)

3rd – Jose Dennis C. Teodosio (Asunto)

Tulang Isinulat para sa mga Bata

1st – Eugene Y. Evasco (May Tiyanak sa Loob ng Aking Bag)

2nd – Jesus M. Santiago (Kuwentong Matanda, Bersong Bata)

3rd – Michael M. Coroza (Munting Daigdig ng Dalit at Awit)

Kabataan essay

1st – Axcel L. Trinidad (Si Ate Elsa, Si Aling Carmen, at Ako Laban sa mga Nangungunang Bansa sa Mundo)

2nd – Johanna Rose E. Calisin (Nagkakaisang Isip, Damdamin at Lakas)

3rd – Maya Victoria S. Rojas (Humabol Ka, Pilipino!)

Maikling Kuwentong Pambata

1st – Genaro R. Gojo Cruz (Mahabang-mahabang-mahaba)

2nd – Michael M. Coroza (Ang mga Kahon ni Kalon)

3rd – Milagros B. Gonzales (Ang Nanay Kong Lola)

Regional division

Short story - Cebuano

1st – Corazon M. Almerino (Sugmat)

2nd – Richel G. Dorotan (Biyahe)

3rd – Ferdinand L. Balino (Mga Mananap sa Kagabhion)

Short story - Hiligaynon

1st – Ferdinand L. Balino (Kanamit Gid Sang Arroz Valenciana)

2nd – Alice Tan Gonzales (Baha)

3rd – Joselito Vladimir D. Perez (Ang Santo Intiero)

Short story – Ilokano

1st – Danilo B. Antalan (Vigan)

2nd – Ariel S. Tabag (Dagiti Ayup Iti Bantay Quimmallugong)

3rd – Reynaldo A. Duque (Ti Kararua Ni Roman Catolico, Mannaniw, Nga Immulog Iti Impierno)

English division

Full-length play

1st – No winner

2nd – No winner

3rd – Floy C. Quintos (Fake)

One–act Play

1st – No winner

2nd – No winner

3rd – Violet B. Lucasi (Balangao)

Kabataan essay

1st – Cristina Gratia T. Tantengco (The Benefits of Selflessness)

2nd – Vincen Gregory Y. Yu (Dreams and Pastures)

3rd – Angelita A. Bombarda (On Being Filipino: A Citizen to the World)

Poetry

1st – Vincenz Serrano (The Collapse of What Separates Us)

2nd – Eliza A. Victoria (Reportage)

3rd – Mark Anthony R. Cayanan (Placelessness: Poems from a Series)

Poetry written for children

1st – Edgardo B. Maranan (The Google Song & Other Rhymes for children)

2nd – Heidi Emily Eusebio Abad (Child of Earth Poems)

3rd – H. Francisco V. Penones Jr. (Turtle and Other Poems for children)

Short story

1st – Sigfredo R. Iñigo (Home of the Sierra Madre)

2nd – Anne Lagamayo (Mr. & Mrs. Reyes and the Polka-dotted Sofa)

3rd – Luis Katigbak (Dear Distance)

Short story for children

1st – Kathleen Aton-Osias (Apolinario and the Name Trader)

2nd – Edgardo B. Maranan (The Artist of the Cave)

3rd – Paolo Gabriel V. Chikiamco (Dear Mr. Supremo)

Essay

1st – Edgardo B. Maranan (A Passage Through the Storm)

2nd – Erlinda Enriquez Panlilio (Saying Goodbye to the House)

3rd – Maria Teresa P. Garcia (Sweet of the Earth)

References

Palanca Awards
Palanca Awards, 2009